92 Field Regiment is part of the Regiment of Artillery of the Indian Army.

Formation 
The regiment was raised on 23 March 1963 at Ambala as 92 Mountain Composite Regiment. Lieutenant Colonel Sukhwant Singh was first commanding officer and the regiment was equipped with howitzers. The unit was subsequently converted into a field regiment.

Composition
The regiment was raised as a pure Sikh regiment.

Operations
The regiment has taken part in the following operations –
Indo-Pakistani War of 1965 (Operation Riddle) – Second Lieutenant Ujagar Singh Rana was awarded the Sena Medal for gallantry in the Khemkaran sector. The regiment lost Captain PM Hashim,Second Lieutenant Padam Nath, Jemadar Teja Singh, Naik Milkha Singh and Lance Naik Balbir Singh during the operations.
Indo-Pakistani War of 1971 (Operation Cactus Lily) - The regiment was part of the divisional artillery of 39 Infantry Division, which itself was under I Corps in the Shakargarh sector. The regiment was part of the divisional offensive, which started on a good note when on the morning of 5 December 1971, the guns of the unit knocked out the Pakistani Artillery Observation Post (OP) at Sukhmal.
Operation Blue Star
Operation Rakshak – the regiment took part in counter insurgency operations in 1989.
Operation Hifazat – The regiment took part in counter insurgency operations in Northeast India between 1993 and 1995.
Operation Vijay
Operation Sahayata in 2001.
Operation Meghdoot – the regiment was posted in the highest battlefield in the world, Siachen Glacier in 2003.

Honours and achievements
Lieutenant General Ranjit Singh Nagra  was commissioned into the unit and went on to command it. He became the Director General Artillery at Army Headquarters in 2002.
Subedar Jagsir Singh was awarded the COAS Commendation Card in 2017.

See also
 List of artillery regiments of Indian Army

References

Military units and formations established in 1963
Artillery regiments of the Indian Army after 1947